The 11th Filmfare Awards South ceremony honoring the winners of the best of South Indian cinema in 1963 is an event held on 1964.

The awards were introduced in 1954, around the films released in 1953. Filmfare Awards initially recognizing the Hindi film industries. In 1964 Awards extended to Best Picture in Tamil, Telugu, Bengali & Marathi.

Jury

Awards

References

 Filmfare Magazine May 15, 1964

General

External links
 
 

Filmfare Awards South